The Celtic Cup was founded by Richard 'Rambo' Gray in 2005 with the first match being held in 2006. It is a British University Ice Hockey competition to feature any Celtic teams who join the British Universities Ice Hockey Association. At present the competition is a one-off match held each year between Cardiff Redhawks and Edinburgh Eagles. These matches are often extremely spirited affairs, but at the end of the game the friendships made remain. The Celtic Cup was set to be named the Richard 'Rambo' Gray Celtic Cup at the end of his University playing Career in 2010, however that honour was forfeited by Gray, as he continues to play an active role as coach in the competition and simply named the new trophy the British Universities Ice Hockey Association Celtic Cup.

History

Celtic Cup

Celtic Plate

Legends of the Cup and Plate
 Richard 'Rambo' Gray: The founder of the Cup. Posted 1 assist through 4 Celtic Cup contests. Captained Edinburgh to victory in 2007.  Coached the Eagles to 11–1 win in 2012 after the cup had a two-year absence.
 Bleddyn 'Blev' Carrington: First player to Captain Cardiff in the Celtic Cup in 2006.  Helped put the whole thing together at Cardiff's end.
 David Rogers: The only Cardiff player to play in all five cups from 2006 to 2012.
 Matt Tisley: Cardiff's top goal scorer in the first Cup in 2006.  Scored the first goal ever in the Celtic Cup.
 Kenney ' Sunshine' Collins: Won the first four cups 2006–2009.  Also one of two Edinburgh Squad members to play in the Cup and Plate in same year (2009) as a goaltender and player respectively.
 Edward Begley: One of two Edinburgh Squad members to play in the Cup and Plate in same year (2009) as a player and goaltender respectively.
 Ian 'King' Arthur: First scorer in the Plate Competition.
 Philip 'Fil' Eddy: Along with being called up for 2 cups he Captained Cardiff B to win the inaugural Plate contest.
  Neil Dolan: Holds a Celtic Cup record with the most goals (7) in a single game and the most points (8) points in the 2012 Cup Game.
  Barry Meikle: Holds the odd distinction of having been captain of the Eagles recreational affiliate (Edinburgh Phoenix) and of having played for Cardiff in the 2012 Celtic Plate.

Celtic Plate
The Celtic Plate began in 2009 as a Varsity game between Edinburgh and Cardiff's B teams.

The Redhawks B won the first 2 contests in 2009 and 2012. The Beagles won their first plate in 2013.

References 

Ice hockey competitions in the United Kingdom
Ice hockey competitions in Scotland